Pyotr Mikhailovich Stefanovsky (2 January 1903 — 23 February 1976) was a Soviet test pilot. During the Second World War, he was in charge of forming special fighter squadrons composed of Soviet test pilots and flew combat missions protecting the airspace above Moscow. He was promoted to Major General in 1944 and was awarded the title Hero of the Soviet Union in 1948.

Stefanovsky recounted his experiences as a test pilot in his book Триста неизвестных (Trista neizvestnykh, Three hundred of the unknown).

References

 

1903 births
1976 deaths
Heroes of the Soviet Union
Russian aviators
Soviet World War II pilots
Soviet Air Force generals
Soviet major generals
Soviet aviators
Soviet military personnel of World War II
Soviet test pilots
Recipients of the Order of Lenin
Recipients of the Order of the Red Banner